Paul Edward Schramka (March 22, 1928 – July 8, 2019) was an American professional baseball left fielder in Major League Baseball. Schramka signed as a free agent in 1949 with the Chicago Cubs and played with the team at the Major League level in 1953 before playing minor league ball in the Cubs' system.  Later in 1953, future Hall of Famer Ernie Banks joined the Cubs and wore the number vacated by Schramka, number 14.

Schramka was born to parents Eugene and Rose, and had two younger brothers, Gene and Tom. His parents were funeral directors, as was his grandfather, an immigrant of Polish-German descent.

Schramka played collegiate baseball at the University of Notre Dame and the University of San Francisco. Schramka was inducted into the University of San Francisco Sports Hall of Fame in 1973. While playing baseball for the Dons of USF, he was coached by Pete Newell. He served in the 4th Infantry Division during the Korean War from October 1950 to October 1952.

After ending his professional baseball career, Schramka returned to the family business, working as a funeral director in Milwaukee. He died on July 8, 2019.

References

External links

Businesspeople from Milwaukee
Baseball players from Milwaukee
Chicago Cubs players
Major League Baseball left fielders
Notre Dame Fighting Irish baseball players
San Francisco Dons baseball players
1928 births
2019 deaths
American funeral directors
United States Army personnel of the Korean War
American people of Polish descent
American people of German descent
Des Moines Bruins players
Springfield Cubs (Massachusetts) players
Beaumont Exporters players
Macon Peaches players
20th-century American businesspeople
21st-century American businesspeople